Yeziel David Morales Miranda (born 16 January 1996) is a Puerto Rican swimmer. He represented Puerto Rico at the World Aquatics Championships in 2013, 2015, 2017 and 2019.

In 2014, he competed at the 2014 Summer Youth Olympics held in Nanjing, China.

In 2014, he won bronze in the men's 200 metre backstroke event at the 2014 Central American and Caribbean Games held in Veracruz, Mexico. In 2018, he won the bronze medal in the men's 4 x 200 metre freestyle relay event at the 2018 Central American and Caribbean Games held in Barranquilla, Colombia.

In 2019, he competed in the men's 100 metre backstroke, men's 200 metre backstroke and the men's 4 × 200 metre freestyle relay events at the 2019 Pan American Games held in Lima, Peru.

References 

Living people
1996 births
Place of birth missing (living people)
Puerto Rican male swimmers
Swimmers at the 2014 Summer Youth Olympics
Competitors at the 2014 Central American and Caribbean Games
Competitors at the 2018 Central American and Caribbean Games
Central American and Caribbean Games bronze medalists for Puerto Rico
Central American and Caribbean Games medalists in swimming
Pan American Games competitors for Puerto Rico
Swimmers at the 2015 Pan American Games
Swimmers at the 2019 Pan American Games
Male backstroke swimmers